The Black Banana (formerly La Banane Noire) was a nightclub in Philadelphia.

History 
The Black Banana began in 1971 as "La Banane Noire," an ice cream parlor and restaurant located at 534 South 4th Street, Philadelphia.

In the late-1970s, it moved to 3rd and Race Street and became a members-only club ("The Crusaders Community Club").

DJs such as Josh Wink, Robbie Tronco, King Britt, Cosmo Baker, Dj Dozia, Jeff Gross (DJ Rush), Michael Sweeney,
Richie Rosati, Willyum, Stango, Suzi Miller and her Bananettes performed at the nightclub, as well as video artists such as Nick London, Nick and Gigi Meoli, Toni Thomas, and uber Philly It-Girl, Kim Kelly. 

The Black Banana suffered a devastating fire in 1991.

The club's founder, Garrick Melmeck died in 1991. The nightclub closed in 1998. 

The building now houses Wexler Fine Arts Gallery.

References

1970 establishments in Pennsylvania
1980s in LGBT history
1998 disestablishments in Pennsylvania
Buildings and structures in Philadelphia
Defunct LGBT nightclubs in the United States
LGBT history in Pennsylvania
LGBT nightclubs in Pennsylvania
History of Philadelphia
LGBT culture in Philadelphia
Nightclubs in Pennsylvania